Girteka Logistics is Europe's leading asset based transport company based in the city of Vilnius, Lithuania. It was founded in 1996 by Mindaugas Raila who, at the age of 24, bought a single used truck complete with a trailer.

Today, it is one of Europe's largest transport companies. The company delivers more than 820 000 full truck loads annually and grew organically from 600 trucks in 2010 to more than 9 000 trucks and 9 700 trailers operating in Europe, Scandinavia and CIS as of 2021.

References

Companies based in Vilnius
Transport companies of Lithuania